Michael Andrew "Drewbie" McFedries (born July 27, 1978) is an American retired mixed martial artist. McFedries formerly competed for the UFC, Titan FC and Shooto.

Background
McFedries was born in Ames, Iowa and raised in Bettendorf, Iowa. His mother, Agnes, battled drug addiction and was also involved in prostitution, forcing the young McFedries to be self-reliant from a young age while also supporting his siblings and often getting into fights. In his freshman year at Bettendorf High School, McFedries was expelled and was on the verge of dropping out of school altogether but was noticed by his gym teacher, and recruited by the head football coach at the school. Both were great mentors to the young McFedries, who would letter in football, track, soccer, and baseball after not competing in organized sports until his sophomore year. After graduating, he attended Iowa Central Community College where he earned an associate's degree and then St. Ambrose University to study sports management but did not graduate. After college, McFedries worked as a bouncer and fought in amateur mixed martial arts fights at a local bar, before being invited by local legendary fighter and coach Pat Miletich, to train at Miletich Fighting Systems.

Mixed martial arts career

Early career
McFedries made his professional debut in 2001 against future UFC veteran Nate Quarry and lost by TKO due to punches. In his next bout, McFedries faced current UFC fighter Claude Patrick and won via unanimous decision.

McFedries then put together his fourth consecutive win before making his UFC debut.

Ultimate Fighting Championship
With a 4-1 professional record, McFedries made his UFC debut and Light Heavyweight debut at UFC 65 against Italian Alessio Sakara on November 11, 2006 in Sacramento, California. Despite being a heavy underdog, McFedries defeated Sakara via TKO in a highly-entertaining fight as the two exchanged huge punches.

In his next bout at UFC 68, McFedries fought against Danish fighter Martin Kampmann and lost via arm-triangle choke submission.

McFedries' next fight was against Bulgarian Olympic wrestler Jordan Radev at UFC Fight Night: Stout vs. Fisher. McFedries won with a highlight-reel knockout only 33 seconds into the fight and won "Knockout of the Night" honors.

His next bout was against Canadian Patrick Côté. Days before Christmas and only a matter of weeks before the fight, McFedries' mother was murdered. McFedries elected to fight anyway but lost via TKO.

In his next bout at The Ultimate Fighter: Team Rampage vs. Team Forrest Finale, McFedries was pitted against former King of the Cage Super Heavyweight Champion Marvin Eastman. McFedries won the fight via knockout and was again awarded "Knockout of the Night" honors.
 
McFedries then lost via kimura submission to Mike Massenzio at UFC Fight Night 15 and to Brazilian jiu-jitsu specialist Thales Leites via rear-naked choke submission at UFC 90.

In 2009, he returned with a TKO victory over Xavier Foupa-Pokam at UFC 98, dominating Foupa-Pokam before the fight was stopped at only 37 seconds into the first round. After criticizing his team Miletich Fighting Systems, McFedries, who had felt that he had not been supported by MFS, learned that he had been kicked out of the camp at the post-fight press conference.

McFedries then lost at the hands of Tomasz Drwal via rear-naked choke submission at UFC 103. Following the loss McFedries was released from his contract. Only the last of McFedries' nine UFC fights got out of the first round, and he holds the record for the shortest average fight time in UFC history (for fighters with more than five UFC bouts) at two minutes and 20 seconds.

Post-UFC career
McFedries was expected to face former King of the Cage Middleweight Champion Joey Villaseñor on September 11, 2010 at Shark Fights 13, but was replaced by Danillo Villefort due to injury.

McFedries returned to train with Miletich Fighting Systems.

In his first post-UFC fight, McFedries faced Samoan Gary Tapusoa on January 29, 2011 at Titan Fighting Championships 16.  He won the fight via TKO.

McFedries then faced Garret Olson in a catchweight bout of 196 lbs. on August 27, 2011 at ProElite 1. He got another TKO victory, in the second round.

McFedries was scheduled to face Zak Cummings at Titan Fighting Championship 25 on September 25, 2012. However McFedries was forced to pull out of the bout due to injury and was replaced by Tommy Speer. It was later announced that Titan Fighting Championship 25 would be postponed due to bad weather conditions.

McFedries faced Jeremy Kimball at Paramount Prize Fighting 1 on January 25, 2013. He lost the fight via unanimous decision.

McFedries returned to action after a two-year hiatus to fight Bill Hill at XFO 55 on April 25, 2015, and won less than a minute in the first round via knockout. After the fight McFedries said he plans on making another run at the UFC.

Personal life
On November 3, 2012 McFedries was stabbed in the upper-shoulder area of his back while working as a bouncer at a Davenport, Iowa night club. McFedries stated in an interview with FightLockdown that if he were not doing mixed martial arts that he would like to have several children, spread his beliefs in Christianity, and possibly do rap music videos with the support of his girlfriend. McFedries is afflicted with Crohn's disease, being diagnosed with the illness around 2002, and has spoken in many interviews about his struggle with the disorder. It has not stopped him from competing in mixed martial arts, but he does believe it has a large effect on his digestive ability. He has a brother who is much younger, and two younger sisters.

Championships and achievements
Ultimate Fighting Championship
Knockout of the Night (Two times) vs. Jordan Radev, Marvin Eastman

Mixed martial arts record

|-
| Win
| align=center| 12–7
| Tony Parker
| TKO (submission to punches)
| XFO 56
| 
| align=center| 2
| align=center| 2:41
| Island Lake, Illinois, United States
|
|-
| Win
| align=center| 11–7
| Bill Hill
| KO (punches)
| XFO 55
| 
| align=center| 1
| align=center| 0:57
| Chicago, Illinois, United States
| 
|-
| Loss
| align=center| 10–7
| Jeremy Kimball
| Decision (unanimous)
| Fight to Win: Paramount Prize Fighting
| 
| align=center| 3
| align=center| 5:00
| Denver, Colorado, United States
| 
|-
| Win
| align=center| 10–6
| Garrett Olson
| TKO (leg kick and punches) 
| ProElite 1: Arlovski vs. Lopez
| 
| align=center| 2
| align=center| 4:04
| Honolulu, Hawaii, United States
| 
|-
| Win
| align=center| 9–6
| Gary Tapusoa
| TKO (punches)
| Titan FC 16: Sylvia vs. Wagner
| 
| align=center| 3
| align=center| 4:42
| Kansas City, Kansas, United States
| 
|-
| Loss
| align=center| 8–6
| Tomasz Drwal
| Submission (rear-naked choke)
| UFC 103
| 
| align=center| 2
| align=center| 1:03
| Dallas, Texas, United States
| 
|-
| Win
| align=center| 8–5
| Xavier Foupa-Pokam
| TKO (punches)
| UFC 98
| 
| align=center| 1
| align=center| 0:37
| Las Vegas, Nevada, United States
| 
|-
| Loss
| align=center| 7–5
| Thales Leites
| Submission (rear-naked choke)
| UFC 90
| 
| align=center| 1
| align=center| 1:18
| Rosemont, Illinois, United States
| 
|-
| Loss
| align=center| 7–4
| Mike Massenzio
| Submission (kimura)
| UFC Fight Night: Diaz vs. Neer
| 
| align=center| 1
| align=center| 1:28
| Omaha, Nebraska, United States
| 
|-
| Win
| align=center| 7–3
| Marvin Eastman
| TKO (punches)
| The Ultimate Fighter 7 Finale
| 
| align=center| 1
| align=center| 1:08
| Las Vegas, Nevada, United States
| 
|-
| Loss
| align=center| 6–3
| Patrick Côté
| TKO (punches)
| UFC Fight Night: Swick vs. Burkman
| 
| align=center| 1
| align=center| 1:44
| Las Vegas, Nevada, United States
| 
|-
| Win
| align=center| 6–2
| Jordan Radev
| KO (punches)
| UFC Fight Night: Stout vs. Fisher
| 
| align=center| 1
| align=center| 0:33
| Hollywood, Florida, United States
| 
|-
| Loss
| align=center| 5–2
| Martin Kampmann
| Technical Submission (arm-triangle choke)
| UFC 68
| 
| align=center| 1
| align=center| 4:06
| Columbus, Ohio, United States
| 
|-
| Win
| align=center| 5–1
| Alessio Sakara
| TKO (punches)
| UFC 65
| 
| align=center| 1
| align=center| 4:07
| Sacramento, California, United States
| 
|-
| Win
| align=center| 4–1
| Brian Monahan
| TKO (punches)
| Extreme Challenge 71
| 
| align=center| 1
| align=center| N/A
| Moline, Illinois, United States
| 
|-
| Win
| align=center| 3–1
| Steve Evan Dau
| TKO (submission to punches)
| Extreme Challenge 51
| 
| align=center| 2
| align=center| 1:26
| St. Charles, Illinois, United States
| 
|-
| Win
| align=center| 2–1
| Rafal Piszczek
| TKO (punches)
| Shooto: Midwest Fighting
| 
| align=center| 2
| align=center| 2:37
| Hammond, Indiana, United States
| 
|-
| Win
| align=center| 1–1
| Claude Patrick
| Decision (unanimous) 
| UCC 10: Battle for the Belts 2002
| 
| align=center| 3
| align=center| 5:00
| Hull, Quebec, Canada
| 
|-
| Loss
| align=center| 0–1
| Nate Quarry
| TKO (exhaustion) 
| Extreme Challenge 43
| 
| align=center| 2
| align=center| 3:03
| Orem, Utah, United States
|

See also
List of male mixed martial artists

Notes and references

External links
 
 

1978 births
Living people
Sportspeople from Ames, Iowa
African-American mixed martial artists
American male mixed martial artists
Mixed martial artists from Iowa
Middleweight mixed martial artists
Light heavyweight mixed martial artists
People from Bettendorf, Iowa
Bettendorf High School alumni
Ultimate Fighting Championship male fighters
21st-century African-American sportspeople
20th-century African-American sportspeople